Jonatan Nahuel Benedetti (born 26 March 1997) is an Argentine professional footballer who plays as a forward for Círculo Deportivo.

Career
Benedetti started his professional career in 2017 with hometown club Aldosivi. His debut came in the Primera División on 7 May, coming on as a substitute in a 0–3 defeat to Huracán. His first start came in the Copa Argentina on 12 June against Central Córdoba as he scored the winning goal to send Aldosivi into the next round. In January 2018, Benedetti completed a loan move to Primera B Metropolitana side San Telmo. He scored on his debut for the club in a 2–1 win over Deportivo Español on 28 January. Benedetti spent the 2019–20 campaign on loan in Primera B Nacional with All Boys. He appeared five times, all of the bench.

In mid-2020, Benedetti had trials in European football with Italian Serie D outfit Licata and Bulgarian First League team Etar. In October, Benedetti penned terms in Italy's fourth tier with Paternò. After just two appearances in Serie D, Benedetti headed back to his homeland with Círculo Deportivo of Torneo Federal A.

Career statistics
.

References

External links

1997 births
Living people
Sportspeople from Mar del Plata
Argentine footballers
Association football forwards
Argentine expatriate footballers
Expatriate footballers in Italy
Argentine expatriate sportspeople in Italy
Argentine Primera División players
Primera Nacional players
Primera B Metropolitana players
Serie D players
Aldosivi footballers
San Telmo footballers
All Boys footballers
A.S.D. Paternò 1908 players